Asaphodes campbellensis is a species of moth in the family Geometridae. It is endemic to Campbell Island in New Zealand.

Taxonomy 
This species was described by J. S. Dugdale in 1964 and named Xanthorhoe campbellensis. In 1971 Dugdale placed this species in the genus Asaphodes. This placement was affirmed by Dugdale in 1988. The male holotype specimen, collected at Shoal Point, Campbell Island, is held at the New Zealand Arthropod Collection.

Description

Dugdale described the species as follows:

Distribution 
This species is endemic to New Zealand and is found on Campbell Island.

Host species 
The host plant of this species is likely Chionochloa.

References

Moths described in 1964
Moths of New Zealand
Larentiinae
Endemic fauna of New Zealand
Fauna of the Campbell Islands
Endemic moths of New Zealand